Johan Wilhelm Eide (13 October 1832 – 2 November 1896) was a Norwegian printer, book publisher and newspaper publisher.

Biography
Eide was born at Stryn in Sogn og Fjordane, Norway. He was the son of Ole Olsen Ytre-Eide (1798-1869) and Anna Vebjørnsdatter (1803-1893).  He was trained as an apprentice in Bergen at the printing plant of F. Beyer bokhandel. In 1857, he applied for a public grant to study book printing and font casts art abroad. He trained in Germany, Switzerland, France and Britain. In 1864, he returned to Bergen where he built up a printing and publishing business. In 1867, he established the printing company J.W. Eides Boktrykkeri. He founded the newspaper Bergens Tidende in 1868, and was a central contributor to this newspaper. In 1880 he founded the publishing house Eide Forlag.

Personal life
Eide was married twice. In 1864, he married Andrea Josephine Thunold (1833-1866), daughter of Ole Olsen Thunold and Karen Oline Olsdatter. In 1869, he married 
Anne Marie Small (1849-1923), daughter of Anders Olsen Lie (1801-1859) and Malene Rasmusdatter Hille (1812-1886). Eide was the father of architect Arne Bjornson Eide (1881-1957).

References

1832 births
1896 deaths
People from Stryn
Norwegian printers
Norwegian book publishers (people)
Norwegian newspaper publishers (people)